Alton Francis Johnson (born 1877, date of death unknown) was an American football player and coach.  He served as the head football coach at Northwestern University for one season in 1908, compiling a record of 2–2.  Johnson was born in Chicago, Illinois.

Head coaching record

References

1877 births
Year of death missing
19th-century players of American football
American football halfbacks
Northwestern Wildcats football coaches
Northwestern Wildcats football players
Sportspeople from Chicago
Players of American football from Chicago